C. J. Davis (born May 7, 1969) is a former Canadian football wide receiver in the Canadian Football League who played for the Edmonton Eskimos. He played college football for the Washington State Cougars.

References

1969 births
Living people
American football wide receivers
Canadian football wide receivers
Edmonton Elks players
Washington State Cougars football players